Nick Rivera may refer to:
 Nick Rivera, darts competitor in the 2008 Las Vegas Desert Classic
 Nick Rivera, composer for the music of CrossBones etc.
 Nick Rivera, a character on Manimal
 Dr. Nick Riviera, a character on the show The Simpsons

See also
 Nicky Jam or Nick Rivera Caminero (born 1980), Puerto Rican singer